Gulzar Houz is a historical fountain located in Hyderabad, India. It is located near Charminar. The fountain is in the middle of the road between Charminar and Madina building.

The  area between the four arches of Charkaman was a vast square called Jilu Khana or the Guard's Square. In the centre of the square was the Char-Su-Ka-Hauz (the cistern of four cardinal points). This was later known as "Suka-Hauz" and now Gulzar Houz. This was built 350 feet equidistant from the four kamaans surrounding it. Initially it was 12 sided then it turned octagonal and today it looks almost circular. 
It was an octagonal shaped water reservoir made for quenching the thirst of the Nizam's soldiers. At that time, there were four streams flowing from this fountain, dividing each of the Radial roads into two halves. It was constructed by Mir Momin Astarabadi , the first prime minister under Mohammed Quli Qutub Shah (5th Sultan of Qutb shahi dynasty) around 400 years ago.

References

Hyderabad State
Heritage structures in Hyderabad, India
Neighbourhoods in Hyderabad, India
Fountains in Hyderabad